is a private university in Osaka, Osaka, Japan, established in 2006.

External links
 Official website

Educational institutions established in 2006
Private universities and colleges in Japan
Universities and colleges in Osaka Prefecture
2006 establishments in Japan